This is a list of electoral results for the electoral district of Elsternwick in Victorian state elections.

Members for Elsternwick

Election results

Elections in the 1960s

Elections in the 1950s

 Two party preferred vote was estimated.

Elections in the 1940s

References

Victoria (Australia) state electoral results by district